Pass the Pipe is an album by the Jamaican reggae band Toots and the Maytals. It was released in 1979 on Mango Records.

Critical reception
New York praised the "raspy lushness" of Toots Hibbert's vocals. The New York Times wrote: "Although customarily raucous, the Maytals' reggae retains a marked gospel intensity. As such, Pass the Pipe does not represent a new direction so much as a greater concentration on one aspect of Toots and company's mature gifts. Highly recommended." The Bay State Banner thought that the "guitar and bass men shun the usual metallic riffing in favor of a reedy vegetable sound that purrs and mushes against your speakers." Stereo Review deemed Pass the Pipe "a recording of special merit."

Dave Thompson, in Reggae & Caribbean Music, thought that on Pass the Pipe "jazz influences creep into the now solidly soulful brew."

Track listing
 "Famine" - 3:13
 "Inside Outside" - 4:00
 "Feel Free" - 4:38
 "Get Up, Stand Up" - 6:18
 "No Difference Here" - 5:42
 "Rhythm Down Low" - 3:29
 "My Love Is So Strong" - 4:35
 "Take It From Me (No Money, No Love) - 6:20

Personnel
Toots Hibbert - vocals
Ansell Collins - piano
Raleigh Gordon - backing vocals
Jerry Mathias - backing vocals

References

Toots and the Maytals albums
1979 albums
Island Records albums